Le Voyage Estate is a compilation album by Italian DJ Gigi D'Agostino, released in 1996 through Virgin Records and BXR Noise Maker.

Track listing
"Desert"
"Sunshine Dance"
"Psychic Harmonic"
"Ikeya Seki"
"Gigi's Violin"
"Purezza"
"Guitar"
"New Year's Day"
"Prophecy"
"Sweet Love"
"Elektro Message"
"Psicadelica"
"Before"
"Angel's Symphony"
"Acidismo"
"X-Moments Theme"
"Paradise"
"Harmosphere"
"Fromage Fraise"

References

Gigi D'Agostino albums
1996 compilation albums